Lami Yakini Thili (born 6 June 1985) is a Congolese football midfielder who plays for F.C. Bravos do Maquis.

References 

1985 births
Living people
Democratic Republic of the Congo footballers
Democratic Republic of the Congo international footballers
Association football midfielders
Democratic Republic of the Congo expatriate footballers
Expatriate footballers in Angola
Democratic Republic of the Congo expatriate sportspeople in Angola
AS Vita Club players
TP Mazembe players
Daring Club Motema Pembe players
Kabuscorp S.C.P. players
F.C. Bravos do Maquis players
21st-century Democratic Republic of the Congo people